Versova (IAST: Varsovā, pronunciation: [ʋəɾsoːʋaː]) is an upmarket neighbourhood in north-western Mumbai. It is known for its beach and the Versova Fort. The beach of Versova recently undertook a massive clean-up effort, labelled as the largest ever beach clean-up.

History 

Versova, originally named Vesave, is a small fishing village of the Kolis, situated to the north of the old Mumbai city. Britain used to call this vis-a-vis and locals gave it the name Visava.

The original name of the village is "Visava", which derives from the Marathi word for "rest" (as in resting place). Later, it was pronounced as "Vesava". The village is mentioned in the writings of Gemelli Careri in 1695.

Versova came under the Portuguese rule in the late medieval period. The Portuguese constructed the Our Lady of Health Church in Versova, and a number of Kolis converted to Christianity during this period. By 1720, it had emerged as a small town, with a small fort and a growing trade in dry fish. In 1739, the Portuguese lost the area to the Marathas, who strengthened the fort. A British force led by Lieutenant-Colonel Henry Keating defeated the Marathas in 1774.

In 1800, the British established a training facility for artillery and engineering cadets. However, the facility was moved to the old Bombay city after a fever epidemic affected nearly all the cadets, and killed many of them. The military establishment was completely removed in 1818.

Kolis of Versova
The people who make Versova alive are the original inhabitants of Mumbai, "Kolis".  Shores of the Versova creek area are surrounded by flourishing Mangroves which support different kinds of marine life, especially molluscs, crabs and fish. Kolis are the fisherfolk who sell their fish at Versova jetty at wholesale prices. They have their own cooperative society of Versova fishermen, wherein they manage all the fishing activities. 

Kolis are believed to be the oldest and original inhabitants of the land that is now Mumbai. 

The Versova Koli Seafood Festival was started in 2006 to help the Koli fishing community with extra income.

Environmental Clean-up Efforts 
By 2015, Versova beach had become choked with up to 5.5 feet of rotting refuse and trash - most of it plastic.

In October 2015, Afroz Shah, a young lawyer and environmentalist in Mumbai moved into the area and along with Harbansh Mathur, an 84-year-old who has since died, began efforts to clean up the beach. Eventually Shah started a volunteer organization, Versova Residents Volunteers, and encouraged volunteers to show up for weekly "dates with the ocean" - so called because of how arduous the work was. Each Sunday the volunteers would gather to remove as much trash as possible. Over the course of 21 months, volunteers removed close to 11,684,500 pounds of trash, most of it plastic.

The volunteers also cleaned up 52 public toilets and planted over 50 coconut trees.

In 2016, Shah was honored with the "Champion of the Earth" award by the United Nations Environment Programme in recognition of his vision and hard work.

In early 2018, Olive Ridley sea turtles returned to the beach for the first time in 20 years to nest and hatchlings were observed heading toward the sea on March 22, 2018.

Recently, Afroz Shah has appeared on several platforms as a champion of the cause to ban plastics and has travelled across the country to several schools in a pledge to refuse, reduce and reuse plastic.World Environment Day 2019: Citizens have enormous power in bringing about climate action, says Afroz Shah- Technology News, Firstpost

See also
Versova Fort
 Aksa Beach

References

Neighbourhoods in Maharashtra
Environmentalism in India